The smalldisk torpedo (Torpedo microdiscus) is a species of fish in the family Torpedinidae. Its natural habitat is open seas.

References

Torpedo (genus)
Fish described in 1985
Taxonomy articles created by Polbot